The Modern Greek Enlightenment (Diafotismos, "enlightenment," "illumination"; also known as the Neo-Hellenic Enlightenment) was the Greek expression of the Age of Enlightenment.

Origins

The Greek Enlightenment was given impetus by the Greek predominance in trade and education in the Ottoman Empire. This allowed Greek merchants to finance a large number of young Greeks to study in universities in Italy and the German states. There, they were introduced to the ideas of the Enlightenment and the French Revolution. It was the wealth of the extensive Greek merchant class that provided the material basis for the intellectual revival that was the prominent feature of Greek life in the half century and more leading to 1821.  It was not by chance that on the eve of the Greek War of Independence the epicenters of Greek learning, i.e. schools-cum-universities, were situated in Ioannina, Chios, Smyrna (Izmir) and Ayvalık (Kydonies), were also Greek commercial centers.

Role of the Phanariotes
The Phanariotes were a small caste of Greek families who took their collective name from the Phanar quarter of Constantinople where the Ecumenical Patriarchate is still housed. They held various administrative posts within the Ottoman Empire, the most important of which were those of hospodar, or prince, of the Danubian principalities of Moldavia and Wallachia. Most hospodars acted as patrons of Greek culture, education, and printing. These academies attracted teachers and pupils from throughout the Orthodox commonwealth, and there was some contact with intellectual trends in Habsburg central Europe. For the most part they supported the Ottoman system of government, too much to play a significant part in the emergence of the Greek national movement; however, their support of learning produced many highly educated Greek scholars who benefited from the cosmopolitan environment the Phanariotes cultivated in their principalities.

This environment was in general a special attraction for young, ambitious and educated Greek people from the Ottoman Empire, contributing to their national enlightenment. The Princely Academies of Bucharest and Iasi also played a crucial role in this movement. Characteristically the authors of the Geographia Neoteriki, one of the most remarkable works of that era, Daniel Philippidis and Grigorios Konstantas, were both educated in this environment.

Aftermath

One effect was the creation of an atticized form of Greek by linguistic purists, which was adopted as the official language of the state and came to be known as Katharevousa (purified). This created diglossia in the Greek linguistic sphere, in which Katharevousa and the vernacular idiom known as Dimotiki were in conflict until the latter half of the 20th century.

The transmission of Enlightenment ideas into Greek thought also influenced the development of a national consciousness. The publication of the journal Hermes o Logios encouraged the ideas of the Enlightenment. The journal's objective was to advance Greek science, philosophy and culture.  Two of the main figures of the Greek Enlightenment, Rigas Feraios and Adamantios Korais, encouraged Greek nationalists to pursue contemporary political thought.

The Greek Enlightenment concerned not only language and the humanities but also the sciences. Some scholars such as Methodios Anthrakites, Evgenios Voulgaris, Athanasios Psalidas, Balanos Vasilopoulos and Nikolaos Darbaris had a background in mathematics and the Physical Sciences and published scientific books into Greek for use in Greek schools. Rigas Feraios also published an Anthology of Physics.

Art

The Greek Enlightenment also included the art of the Heptanese School.  Notable artists of the Greek Enlightenment in art include: Panagiotis Doxaras, Nikolaos Doxaras, Nikolaos Kantounis, Nikolaos Koutouzis and Gerasimos Pitsamanos.  Greek art began to diverge from the traditional Maniera Greca drastically migrating to the Venetian Maniera Italiana.  The art began to exhibit its own style.  Greek painting eras include the Greek Rocco, Greek Neoclassicism and Greek Romanticism.  The movements carried Greek artists into the era of Modern Greek Art.  Most historians refer to this period as the Neo Hellenikos Diafotismos in painting.

There were many artists associated with the era that were not from the Ionian Islands.  These artists were in different parts of the Ottoman Empire or Venetian Empire.  Some artists were active in the Cyclades such Christodoulos Kalergis and Emmanuel Skordilis.
Ioannis Koronaros migrated from Crete to Egypt and finally settled in Cyprus.  Although the Cretan Renaissance ended, there were still few active workshops on the island.  Many of these artists belonged to the Neo Hellinkos Diafotismos.  

The Modern Greek Enlightenment in Art did not only belong to the Heptanese School but all of the Greek communities or the so-called ancestors of Ancient Greek Civilization.  This group lived throughout what is now considered modern Greece.  There were also countless Greek artists active in Constantinople, now called Istanbul.  Research is constantly underway by the Neohellenic Institute, hundreds of Greek painters and other artists have been cataloged from the 15th century until the Greek War of Independence.

Notable people and societies

 Neophytos Doukas (1760–1845), a scholar and prolific writer, who wrote about 70 books and rendered many ancient texts into Modern Greek.
 Rigas Feraios, Greek emigre to Vienna. He was an admirer of the French revolution and hoped to transplant its humanistic ideas to the Greek world. He imagined a pan-Balkan uprising against the Ottomans.
 Adamantios Korais, witness of the French Revolution, Korais took his primary intellectual inspiration from the Enlightenment, and he borrowed ideas copiously from the philosophers Thomas Hobbes, John Locke and Jean-Jacques Rousseau.
 Theophilos Kairis, influenced by the French Enlightenment and critical to the Eastern Orthodox Church. He founded a pietistic revivalist movement, known as Theosebism, inspired by the French revolutionary cults, radical Protestantism and deism which was anathematised by the Synod of the Patriarchate of Constantinople. He had a very different vision for the independent Greece, one that was based upon the concept of separation of church and state.
 Theoklitos Farmakidis, inspired by the French Revolution, strongly pro-West and critical to the Ecumenical Patriarchate of Constantinople.
 Filomousos Eteria, the name of two (Athens and Vienna) philological and philhellene organizations.
 Filiki Eteria, the Society of Friends in Greek, was a secret society working in the early 19th century, whose purpose was to overthrow Ottoman rule and to establish an independent Greek state founded on the humanist ideals of the Enlightenment. Many young Phanariot Greeks were among its members.

See also
 French Enlightenment
 Athanasios Psalidas
 Neophytos Vamvas
 Ellinoglosso Xenodocheio
 Greek War of Independence

References

Further reading 
 Dimitris Michalopoulos, "Aristotle vs Plato. The Balkans' Paradoxical Enlightenment", Bulgarian Journal of Science and Education Policy (BJSEP), 1 (2007), pp. 7–15. ISSN 1313-1958.
 Anna Tabaki, "Enlightenment", Encyclopedia of Greece and the Hellenic Tradition, Editor Graham Speake, Volume vol.1 A-K, Fitzroy Dearborn Publishers, London-Chicago, 2000, pp. 547–551.
 Anna Tabaki, "Greece", Encyclopedia of the Enlightenment, Alan Charles Kors Editor in Chief, Volume 2, Oxford University Press, 2003, pp. 157–160.
 Anna Tabaki,
 Anna Tabaki, "Les Lumières néo-helléniques. Un essai de définition et de périodisation", The Enlightenment in Europe, Les Lumières en Europe, Aufklärung in Europa. Unity and Diversity, Unité et Diversité, Einheit und Vielfalt.  Edited by /édité par / hrsg. von Werner Schneiders avec l’introduction générale de Roland Mortier, [European Science Foundation] Concepts et Symboles du Dix-huitième Siècle Européen, Concepts and Symbols of the Eighteenth Century in Europe, BWV • Berliner Wissenschafts - Verlag, 2003, pp. 45–56.

 
Age of Enlightenment
History of philosophy